Fynn is a surname. Notable people with the surname include:

 Charles Fynn (1897–1976), English cricketer
 David Fynn, Irish actor, producer and screenwriter
 Henry Francis Fynn (1803–1861), English traveler and trader
 James Fynn (1893–1917), English recipient of the Victoria Cross
 James Lindsay-Fynn (born 1975), British rower
 Mark Fynn (born 1985) Zimbabwean tennis player. 
 Paula Fynn (born 1988), team handball player from Uruguay
 Warrick Fynn (born 1985), cricketer

Given name
 Fynn Arkenberg (born 1996), German footballer
 Fynn Hudson-Prentice (born 1996), English cricketer
 Fynn Gutzeit (born 1990), German footballer

See also
 Fynn, pseudonymous writer of Mister God, This Is Anna and its sequels (1970s), probably Sydney George Hopkins